Rui Campos or Rui (2 August 1922 – 2 January 2002) was a Brazilian football player. He played for the Brazil in the 1950 FIFA World Cup.

Career
Born in São Paulo, He played for Bonsucesso, Fluminense, Bangu, São Paulo and Palmeiras during his career. At São Paulo, he formed a successful midfield trio with José Carlos Bauer and Alfredo Noronha.

National team
Rui Campos played 30 matches for the Brazil national team between 1944 and 1950, including 1950 FIFA World Cup matches.

References

External links
Profile

1922 births
2002 deaths
Footballers from São Paulo
Brazilian footballers
Bonsucesso Futebol Clube players
Fluminense FC players
Bangu Atlético Clube players
São Paulo FC players
Sociedade Esportiva Palmeiras players
Brazil international footballers
1950 FIFA World Cup players
Association football midfielders